Kaweka J, also known as Mount Kaweka, is the highest mountain in the Kaweka Range.

The mountain is the highest point in the Hawke's Bay region.

References

Hastings District
Mountains of the Hawke's Bay Region